Wojciech Wiewiórowski  is a Polish lawyer, university teacher and former National Personal Data Protection Inspector in Poland. He currently holds the seat of European Data Protection Supervisor.

He was born on 13 June 1971 in Łęczyca, Central Poland. In 1995 he graduated from Faculty of Law in University of Gdańsk. He obtained his PhD in law in 2000.

In 2006 he entered public service, being appointed as an IT advisor to Ludwik Dorn, at the time the Minister of Interior and Administration in Poland. In 2008 he took the seat of the chief information officer in this ministry.

On 25 June 2010 he was appointed as the National Data Protection Inspector in Poland. He was holding that position until 2014, when he became the Assistant General Inspector in the office of European Data Protection Supervisor, at that time Giovanni Buttarelli. When he died, Dr Wiewiórowski was appointed as in-charge. Then in November 2019 he was recommended by the European Parliament to take the seat of the Inspector. He took the office on 6 December 2019.

His research interests include Legal technology as well as Personal data protection. He lives in Brussels with his wife and two daughters.

References 

1971 births
Living people